The North East Scotland Football Association is an affiliated association of the Scottish Welfare Football Association, which itself is affiliated to the Scottish Football Association. It oversees recreational football mainly around the district of Buchan, in Aberdeenshire, Scotland.

The defending Premier Division champions are Invercairn United.

Competing clubs are also eligible to enter the Donald McNair Cup (a national competition for Welfare clubs) and the Highland Cup, contested against clubs from the Moray Welfare League

Season 2022

References

Football in Aberdeenshire
Football governing bodies in Scotland
Scottish Welfare Football Association
Football leagues in Scotland